Mardi Gras is the seventh and final studio album by American rock band Creedence Clearwater Revival, released on April 11, 1972. Recorded after the departure of guitarist Tom Fogerty, it was the band's only studio album as a trio, and featured songs written, sung, and produced by each of the remaining members, rather than just John Fogerty. The recording sessions were marred by personal and creative tensions, and the group disbanded after a short U.S. tour to support the album.

Overview
Unlike previous albums, on Mardi Gras, Stu Cook and Doug Clifford shared songwriting and production duties with John Fogerty, and they also provided their own lead vocal contributions for the first time. Due to the quality of what resulted when Fogerty ceded some of his control over the band to the other members, Jon Landau opened his original Rolling Stone review with the statement: "In the future, Mardi Gras may be known as Fogerty's Revenge." On October 16, 1972, six months after the release of the album, CCR and its record label, Fantasy Records, released a statement announcing the official disbanding of the group.

Production
Except for "Sweet Hitch-Hiker" and "Door to Door", which were recorded in the spring of 1971, Mardi Gras was recorded in January 1972. After Tom Fogerty, John's older brother, had departed the group in early 1971 following a dispute that was, in large part, caused by his desire to play a larger creative role and John's insistence on being the band's only singer/songwriter/business manager, John Fogerty only contributed three original songs to Mardi Gras and sang lead on a fourth, a cover of the 1961 Ricky Nelson-hit "Hello Mary Lou". According to Cook and Clifford, it was John Fogerty's idea for all of the remaining members to contribute an equal number of new songs, despite their reservations. They believed he was bitter over Tom Fogerty's departure and their own requests to have additional say in the group's musical decisions, and that he was looking for an excuse to break up CCR to pursue a solo career. When Clifford and Cook at first demurred at the idea of having to supply two-thirds of the album's material themselves, they have said John Fogerty threatened to quit the band, and that, when they agreed, he refused to contribute any vocals or instrumentation to their songs, except for guitar.

The album was a commercial success, peaking at number 12 on the Billboard Hot 100 and going gold, and contained two Top 40 singles, the raucous "Sweet Hitch-Hiker" and the wistful swan song "Someday Never Comes" (both of which were written and sung by Fogerty), but mounting financial and legal woes compounded the fragile situation within the band, and CCR broke up shortly after the Mardi Gras tour ended. In 1976, John Fogerty told Rolling Stone: "I figured that Creedence made six albums. Let me count... the first one, Bayou Country, Green River, Willy and the Poor Boys, Cosmo's Factory, Pendulum... yeah, six. I wouldn’t even count Mardi Gras and neither would anybody else. I had no control over anything after that. The rest is horse manure. Baloney."

Reception

Reviews for the album were mixed to poor, with Jon Landau writing in his May 25, 1972, review for Rolling Stone that it was, "relative to a group's established level of performance, the worst album I have ever heard from a major rock band." In a rare positive review, Gene Sculatti of Phonograph Record praised John Fogerty's performance on the record, but noted the absence of Tom Fogerty as a downside. He concluded: "It may not be Green River or Cosmo's Factory, but Mardi Gras offers some of Creedence's finest moments, and it's a damn good answer to any and all of those 'Rock is Dying' clowns."

Mardi Gras was not remastered and reissued on CD until 2000. A remastered version of the album was featured on the 40th anniversary CCR box set, but not as a stand-alone album. It was remastered and released on 180 Gram Vinyl by Analogue Productions in 2006. The album was re-released in remastered format as a Japan exclusive in January 2011.

Track listing

Personnel
Creedence Clearwater Revival
 Doug Clifford – vocals, drums, production, arrangement
 Stu Cook – vocals, bass, lead and rhythm guitars, keyboards, production, arrangement
 John Fogerty – vocals, lead and rhythm guitars, keyboards, harmonica, production, arrangement

Technical personnel
 Tamaki Beck – mastering supervision
 Bob Fogerty – photography
 Russ Gary – engineering
 George Horn – remastering
 Tony Lane – art direction, design, cover design
 Shigeo Miyamoto – mastering
Craig Werner – liner notes on CD version
Baron Wolman – photography

Charts

Weekly charts

Year-end charts

References

External links

1972 albums
Albums produced by Doug Clifford
Albums produced by John Fogerty
Albums produced by Stu Cook
Creedence Clearwater Revival albums
Country rock albums by American artists
Fantasy Records albums